Where the Fast Lane Ends is the 12th country studio album by the American country music group The Oak Ridge Boys, released via MCA Records in 1987. The album features the singles "This Crazy Love" and "It Takes a Little Rain (To Make Love Grow)".

This was the group's last album to feature William Lee Golden, who left the group for a solo career, until 1997. It was also the group's first album produced by Jimmy Bowen, who replaced Ron Chancey.

People magazine's Ralph Novak and Mary Shaugnessy gave the album a negative review, calling it "listless" and saying that "It Takes a Little Rain" was the only "pleasant" song on it.

Track listing

Personnel

The Oak Ridge Boys
Duane Allen - lead vocals
Joe Bonsall - tenor vocals
William Lee Golden - baritone vocals
Richard Sterban - bass vocals

Additional musicians
Richard Bennett - acoustic guitar
Larry Byrom - electric guitar
David Hungate - bass guitar
John Barlow Jarvis - keyboards
Russ Kunkel - drums, percussion
Patti LaBelle - super vocals on "Rainbow at Midnight"
Mat Morse - synclavier programming
Skip SoRelle - synclavier programming
Billy Joe Walker Jr. - electric guitar, synthesizer
Joe Walsh - electric guitar and slide guitar on "Rainbow at Midnight"

Chart performance

References

1987 albums
The Oak Ridge Boys albums
MCA Records albums
Albums produced by Jimmy Bowen